Ralph Myers was an American football coach. He served as the head football coach at Central State Teachers College—now the University of Central Oklahoma—in 1920, compiling a career college football record of 4–3–1. He ranks seventh all-time for Broncho coaches in winning percentage, and 12th in number of games coached and won.

Head coaching record

Football

References

Year of birth missing
Year of death missing
Central Oklahoma Bronchos football coaches